The Solomons mastiff bat (Chaerephon solomonis) is a species of bat in the family Molossidae. It is endemic to the Solomon Islands.

Taxonomy and etymology
It was described as a new species by Australian mammalogist Ellis Le Geyt Troughton in 1931. Troughton likely chose the species name "solomonis" because this species was first discovered on the Solomon Islands. It is sometimes classified as a subspecies of the northern freetail bat, Chaerephon jobensis.

The genus Chaerephon was formerly considered a subgenus of or synonymous with the genus Tadarida, meaning that this species has been known as Tadarida jobensis solomonis or Tadarida solomonis.

Description
Its fur is a rich, auburn brown, with white hairs interspersed infrequently. Its tragus is lobed and broad at the tip.

Range and habitat
Its range is currently known to include Choiseul Island and Santa Isabel Island, both of which are part of the Solomon Islands.

Conservation
It is evaluated as endangered by the IUCN.

References

Chaerephon (bat)
Bats of Oceania
Endemic fauna of the Solomon Islands
Mammals of the Solomon Islands
Mammals described in 1931
Taxonomy articles created by Polbot